Cheyne Fowler (born 8 March 1982) is a South African professional footballer who plays in Finland for VPS. He previously played for FC Haka. He also holds Finnish nationality.

Early life
Fowler was born in Cape Town in 1982. His maternal grandparents and his mother Taina-Liisa had moved there from Valkeakoski, Finland, when his mother was one year old. Fowler's mother worked as an auditor and his father Anthony Fowler worked in tourism. Fowler started playing football in local Hellenic FC, but moved to Finland in 2002 and joined Haka Valkeakoski's juniors.

Playing career
Fowler made his professional debut in 2003, when he played for Haka in the Veikkausliiga. He spent five seasons playing for Haka, until in 2009 moved to HJK Helsinki in the Finnish capital. In January 2008, he was near to move to Avellino, but Avellino's manager was sacked and the deal collapsed.

In 2010, Fowler started his service in Finnish military as a conscript.

On 27 October 2011 it was announced that Fowler will sign a two-year contract with VPS after his contract with HJK will expire after the 2011 season.

Honours

Club titles
Finnish championship: 2004, 2009, 2010, 2011
Finnish Cup: 2005, 2011

References

External links
 Profile at HJK.fi
 Stats at Veikkausliiga.com
 Player profile at The Guardian

1982 births
Living people
Sportspeople from Cape Town
South African soccer players
Finnish footballers
Veikkausliiga players
FC Haka players
Helsingin Jalkapalloklubi players
Vaasan Palloseura players
White South African people
Association football defenders
Finnish people of South African descent
South African people of Finnish descent